The 1925 San Diego mayoral election was held on March 24, 1925 to elect the mayor for San Diego. Incumbent mayor John L. Bacon stood for reelection to a third term. In the primary election, Bacon received a majority of the votes and was elected outright with no need for a contested runoff.

Candidates
John L. Bacon, Mayor of San Diego
Fred A. Heilbron, member of the San Diego City Council
George L. Mayne
Marcus W. Robbins
William I. Kinsley

Campaign
Incumbent Mayor John L. Bacon stood for reelection to a third term. On March 24, 1923, Bacon received an absolute majority of 50.3 percent in the primary election, more than 24 percent higher than his nearest competitor, Fred A. Heilbron. Bacon received one hundred percent of the vote in the uncontested runoff election held April 7, 1925 and was elected to the office of the mayor.

Primary Election results

General Election results
Because Bacon won outright in the primary with a majority of the vote, his was the only eligible name on the runoff ballot.

References

1925
1925 California elections
1925
1925 United States mayoral elections
March 1925 events